Tales from the Sick is the debut studio album by American rapper Prozak. The album was released on June 3, 2008. It is the rapper's first release on Strange Music and is his first release of solo material following his first solo EP Aftabirth which was released in 2001. The album peaked at #8 on the Billboard Top Heatseekers chart, #25 on the Top Independent Albums chart and #52 on the Top R&B/Hip-Hop Albums chart.

Track listing

References

Prozak (rapper) albums
2008 debut albums
Strange Music albums